The 2014 Grand Prix de Oriente was a single-day women's cycle race held in El Salvador on 7 March 2014. The race held a UCI rating of 1.2.

Results

See also
 2014 in women's road cycling

References

2014 in Salvadoran sport
2014 in women's road cycling
Grand Prix de Oriente